This is a list of episodes for the American television sitcom Empty Nest, a spinoff of The Golden Girls that originally aired on NBC from October 8, 1988, to April 29, 1995. Over the series run, 170 original episodes aired.

During its run, Empty Nest had two crossover stories with The Golden Girls and Nurses. The episode "Windy" continues an event depicting a hurricane that begins on the hour-long Golden Girls episode "The Monkey Show" and concludes on the Nurses episode "Begone with the Wind". The episode "Dr. Weston and Mr. Hyde" continues an event depicting a full moon that begins on the hour-long Golden Girls episode "A Midwinter Night's Dream" and concludes on the Nurses episode "Moon Over Miami".

Series overview

Episodes

Season 1 (1988–89)

Season 2 (1989–90)

Season 3 (1990–91)

Season 4 (1991–92)

Season 5 (1992–93)

Season 6 (1993–94)

Season 7 (1994–95)

References

External links

Lists of American sitcom episodes